Rescue One Financial is a financial services company located in Irvine, CA. It ranks #21 in the Inc. 500|5000 top 100 fastest growing companies within the Financial Services Industry, with an overall ranking of 308. The company is a member of the American Fair Credit Council.

History 

Rescue One Financial was founded in 2007 by Bradley Smith, Mark Photoglou, and Branden Millstone with a focus on consumer debt management. Services are offered in 31 states. The company manages $2 billion of consumer debt, with over 750 million dollars of unsecured debt settled.

In 2013, the company showed a three-year growth of 1,406%, with revenues of $31.6 Million in 2012, compared to $2.1 Million in 2009. During that time, they added 26 jobs, bringing the total number of employees for 2013 to 53. Currently, the company boasts 181 employees in 2019.

Co-Founder and CEO Bradley Smith was previously a key player in a notable Rule 144 trade at Merrill Lynch, selling more than 5 million shares of The Walt Disney Company. Smith was featured in Inc. Magazine in September 2010 as "America's Fastest Growing Debt Collector,", in Inc's award-winning article "The Psychological Price of Entrepreneurship" by Jessica Bruder in September 2013, and has been featured in the media as a financial expert. The Deadline Club award in Magazine Personal Service category was won for the article "The Psychological Price of Entrepreneurship". Smith was also named part of the Forbes Executive Financial Council and the company manages over 100,000 clients.

Accreditations/Certifications 
Member of the AFCC, The American Fair Credit Council 

Certified by the International Association of Professional Debt Arbitrators (IAPDA) 

The United States Organizations for Bankruptcy Alternatives (USOBA)

See also 
 Bankruptcy
 Debt
 Credit Counseling
 List of finance topics

References

External links 
 Rescue One Financial
 Inc. Magazine, September 2013: "The Psychological Price of Entrepreneurship" by Jessica Bruder

Financial services companies based in California
Credit management
Companies based in Irvine, California
Financial services companies established in 2007
2007 establishments in California